Kārlis Paegle (4 October 1911 – 23 December 1997) was a Latvian ice hockey player. He played for Rīgas RFK, HK ASK Rīga, Dinamo Riga, and Rīgas Sporta klubs during his career. Paegle also played for the Latvia national team at the 1936 Winter Olympics and three World Championships. He also played football, and made one appearance for the Latvia national team.

References

External links
 

1911 births
1997 deaths
Ice hockey players at the 1936 Winter Olympics
Latvian ice hockey defencemen
Olympic ice hockey players of Latvia
Footballers from Riga
People from the Governorate of Livonia
Latvian footballers
Latvia international footballers
Association footballers not categorized by position
Ice hockey people from Riga